"Out of Our Heads" is a song recorded by English band Take That. It was released as a digital download and for streaming through Polydor Records on 11 October 2018 as the second single from their compilation album, Odyssey. The song was written by Gary Barlow, Howard Donald and Mark Owen, and produced by Stuart Price.

Critical reception

Clash gave a positive review of the song stating, "A personal highlight is 'Out of our Heads', as Barlow and co pay homage to the jumpin-jazz era of the 50s." Described as being a favourable cross between Paulo Nutini and Ray Charles.

Live performances
 Strictly Come Dancing (18 November 2018)

Music video
A music video to accompany the release of "Out of Our Heads" was first released onto YouTube on 2 November 2018 at a total length of two minutes and fifty-seven seconds.

Charts

References

2018 singles
2018 songs
Take That songs
Songs written by Gary Barlow
Songs written by Howard Donald
Songs written by Mark Owen
Song recordings produced by Stuart Price